Fedtshenkomyia is a genus of flies in the family Dolichopodidae. It contains only one species, Fedtshenkomyia chrysotymoides, known from Turkistan.

References

Dolichopodidae genera
Peloropeodinae
Diptera of Asia
Monotypic Diptera genera
Taxa named by Aleksandr Stackelberg
Insects of Central Asia